La hermandad – en el principio fue el ruido (The brotherhood - in the beginning was noise), subtitled En el final fue el silencio (In the end was silence) is a special album by the German punk band Die Toten Hosen for a release in Argentina. It is marketed as an Argentinian version of In aller Stille, although it also contains remixes from Zurück zum Glück. In addition to 9 original songs from In aller Stille and 6 remixes from Zurück zum Glück era there are also 3 new songs, of which 2 feature lyrics in both Spanish and German ("Vida desesperada" and "Viva la muerte") and one is purely in Spanish ("Uno, dos, ultraviolento"), a cover from Los Violadores, oldest Argentine punk band. The album will also be available in Germany.

A live video was made for "Uno, dos, ultraviolento" in Argentina in El Teatro. The performance was filmed with a finger camera.

Track listing
 "Strom" (Current) (Frege/Frege) − 2:48 (from In aller Stille)
 "Weißes Rauschen" (Remix) (White noise) (Meurer/Frege) − 2:07 (from Zurück zum Glück)
 "Innen alles neu" (Inside All New) (Meurer/Frege) − 2:57 (from In aller Stille)
 "Disco" (Frege/Frege) − 3:22 (from In aller Stille)
 "Vida desesperada" (Desperate Life) (Breitkopf/Frege) − 3:11
 "Ich bin die Sehnsucht in dir" (Remix) (I am the Longing in You) (von Holst/Frege, Weitholz) − 4:03 (from Zurück zum Glück)
 "Pessimist" (Breitkopf/Frege) − 2:47 (from In aller Stille)
 "Friss oder stirb" (Remix) (Feed or Die) (von Holst/Frege) − 3:44 (from "Friss oder stirb")
 "Viva la muerte" (Long Live Death) (Mayer-Poes/Mahler) − 3:59 (Slime cover)
 "Leben ist tödlich" (Life Is Deadly) (Meurer/Frege) − 3:26 (from In aller Stille)
 "Goodbye Garageland" (Remix) (Frege, Ritchie, Matt Dangerfield) − 2:23 (from "Friss oder stirb")
 "The Guns of Brixton" (Remix) (Paul Simonon/Simonon) − 2:57 (The Clash cover; from "Freunde")
 "Teil von mir" (Part of Me) (von Holst/Frege) − 3:00 (from In aller Stille)
 "Alles was war" (All That Was) (Breitkopf/Frege) − 3:05 (from In aller Stille)
 "Die letzte Schlacht" (The Last Battle) (von Holst, Meurer/Frege) − 3:03 (from In aller Stille)
 "Uno, dos, ultraviolento" (One, Two, ultraviolent) (Stuka/Stuka) − 2:57 (Los Violadores cover)
 "Freunde" (Remix) (Friends) (Frege, von Holst/Frege) − 4:05 (from Zurück zum Glück)
 "Angst" (Fear) (von Holst/Frege) − 3:12 (from In aller Stille)

Personnel
Campino - vocals
Andreas von Holst (Kuddel) - guitar
Michael Breitkopf (Breiti) - guitar
Andreas Meurer (Andi) - bass
Stephen George Ritchie (Vom) - drums

References 

Die Toten Hosen albums
2009 albums